The 1983–84 Maryland Terrapins men's basketball team represented the University of Maryland in the 1983–1984 college basketball season as a member of the Atlantic Coast Conference (ACC). The team was led by head coach Charles "Lefty" Driesell and played their home games at the Cole Field House. They won the 1984 ACC men's basketball tournament and advanced to the Sweet 16 in the 1984 NCAA basketball tournament.

Roster

Schedule 

|-
!colspan=6|Regular Season

|-
!colspan=6|ACC Tournament

|-
!colspan=6|NCAA Tournament

Rankings

References

Maryland Terrapins men's basketball seasons
Maryland
Maryland
Maryland
Maryland